Girija Oak is an Indian actress known for her performances in Taare Zameen Par and Shor in the City.

Career
Oak made her debut on the big screen at the age of 15. She acted in Marathi movies including Goshta Choti Dongraevadhi, Gulmohar, Manini and Adgule Madgule.

Her first Marathi television show as lead actress was Zee Marathi's Lajja with Piyush Ranade, Tejaswini Pandit and Mukta Barve. She portrayed scandal victim Manaswini Desai (Manu) who was supported by young CID Inspector Aakash Ketkar (played by Piyush Ranade). She has also played leading roles in Marathi plays.

In 2018, Oak made her short film debut with the film Quarter directed by Navjyot Bandiwadekar. 
The film was premiered at the 71st Cannes Film Festival in the Court Métrage (Short Film Corner) category and was later showcased at more than 12 International Film festivals. For her performance in the film, Oak won her first international award as Best Actress at the European Cinematography Awards 2018 and was nominated as Best International Actress at the Maverick Movie Awards 2018. Quarter was the first Indian short film to launch a poster and trailer at a public event attended by members of the Indian press and Indian film industry personalities.  The film was digitally released worldwide on 10 April 2020.

From 2018 to 2019 Oak played the lead role in the second season of the Hindi serial Ladies Special on Sony Entertainment Television. She was the finalist of the popular singing contest Singing Star.

Personal life
Oak is the daughter of Marathi actor Girish Oak. She completed her degree in biotechnology from Thakur College of Science and Commerce Kandivali East, Mumbai. She joined a theater workshop and started acting in advertisements.

Oak is married to Suhrud Godbole. She is the daughter-in-law of Marathi film actor, dialog writer and film producer Shrirang Godbole.

Filmography

References

External links
 
 

1987 births
Living people
Actresses from Nagpur
Indian stage actresses
Indian film actresses
Actresses in Hindi cinema
Marathi actors
Actresses in Marathi cinema
Actresses in Kannada cinema
21st-century Indian actresses